Aine may refer to:

 Áine, Irish goddess of summer, wealth and sovereignty
 Áine (given name), an Irish female given name
 Aine, Dahanu, a village in Maharashtra, India
 Hugo Aine, French footballer